Rocky V is a 1990 American sports drama film directed by John G. Avildsen and written by and starring Sylvester Stallone. It is the sequel to Rocky IV (1985) and the fifth installment in the Rocky film series. It also stars Talia Shire, Burt Young, Sage Stallone, Tommy Morrison, and Burgess Meredith. In the film, a financially struggling Rocky Balboa (Stallone) agrees to train protégé Tommy Gunn (Morrison) at the gym once owned by Balboa's trainer, Mickey Goldmill (Meredith).

Development for the film began in 1989, after Stallone completed the screenplay. Avildsen, who directed the first installment, was soon confirmed to return and principal photography began in January 1990, being largely filmed on location around Philadelphia. The filmmakers encountered creative differences with United Artists and were disallowed to include darker elements of Stallone's original screenplay, who had envisioned Rocky V as the final film in the franchise. The film also marks the final appearances of Shire and Meredith in the franchise.

Rocky V was released in the United States on November 16, 1990. The film received negative reviews from critics, with criticism for its screenplay, characterization, continuity errors, and medical inaccuracies; Stallone later expressed regret over the outcome of the film. It is usually considered the worst film of the Rocky series. Rocky V also underperformed expectations at the box office, grossing $119.9 million worldwide, making it the lowest grossing film in the series. A sequel, Rocky Balboa, was released in 2006.

Plot

During the aftermath of his victory over Ivan Drago in Moscow, Rocky finds himself experiencing physical complications from the fight. Rocky, his wife Adrian, his brother-in-law Paulie, and his trainer Tony "Duke" Evers return to the United States where they are greeted by Rocky's son, Robert Jr. who is now 14. At a press conference, boxing promoter George Washington Duke attempts to goad Rocky into fighting his boxer, Union Cane, who is the top-rated challenger, but Rocky declines.

After returning home, Rocky and Adrian discover they are bankrupt after Paulie was fooled into signing a "power of attorney" over to Rocky's accountant, who squandered all of his money on real estate deals gone sour and failed to pay Rocky's taxes over the previous six years. His mansion has been mortgaged by $400,000, but his attorney tells Rocky that it is fixable with a few more fights. Rocky initially accepts the fight with Cane, but Adrian urges him to see a doctor, and he is diagnosed with cavum septum pellucidum.

Reluctantly, Rocky retires from boxing. His home and belongings are sold to pay the debt and the Balboas move back to their old working-class neighborhood in Philadelphia. Rocky visits Mighty Mick's Gym (willed to his son by his old trainer Mickey Goldmill), which has fallen into disrepair. Seeing a vision of himself and Mickey from years past, Rocky draws inspiration to become a trainer himself and reopens the gym.

Rocky and Paulie meet a young fighter from Oklahoma named Tommy Gunn. Rocky agrees to become his manager. Training him gives Rocky a sense of purpose, and Tommy rises to become a top contender. Distracted with Tommy's training, Rocky neglects Robert, who is being bullied at school. After learning to defend himself, Robert falls in with the wrong crowd and becomes withdrawn from his family.

Union Cane wins the vacant world heavyweight title. Still wanting to do business with Rocky, Washington showers Tommy with luxuries and promises him that he is the only path to a shot at the title. Rocky insists dealing with Washington will end badly, causing Tommy to desert him. Adrian attempts to comfort Rocky but Rocky vents his frustrations by telling her his life had a new meaning by training Tommy. Adrian tells Rocky that Tommy never had his heart and that was something he could never learn. Realizing that his family is his top priority, Rocky apologizes to Adrian and the two embrace. Rocky then apologizes to Robert and they mend their relationship.

Tommy defeats Cane for the heavyweight title with a first-round knockout, but is jeered by spectators for leaving Rocky and hounded by reporters after the fight. Tommy gives all the credit for his success to George Washington Duke, which only fans the flames of contempt for Tommy by the fans and media. They insist that Cane was nothing but a "paper champion", because Cane did not win the title from Balboa.

Washington convinces Tommy that he needs to secure a fight with Rocky to refute the notion that he is not the real champion. Washington and Tommy show up at the local bar with a live television crew to goad Rocky into accepting a title fight. Rocky declines and tries to reason with him, but Tommy calls him weak, prompting Paulie to stand up for Rocky. When Tommy punches Paulie, Rocky challenges Tommy to a street fight on the spot; despite Duke's objections, Tommy accepts.

Rocky initially knocks Tommy to the ground with a flurry of punches, but Tommy gets up and attacks Rocky from behind. Rocky is beaten down by Tommy, seeing nightmarish visions of Drago, before a vision of Mickey urges him to get up and continue the fight. When Robert and Adrian see the brawl being televised, they rush to the back alley to cheer for Rocky. With Robert, Paulie, Adrian and the neighborhood crowd cheering him on, Rocky makes use of his street-fighting skills and defeats Tommy.

While Tommy is escorted away by the police, Washington threatens to sue Rocky if he touches him. After a brief hesitation, Rocky knocks him onto the hood of a car, defiantly replying "Sue me for what?"

Months later, Rocky and Robert climb up the Rocky Steps, see his statue, and are about to go inside and explore the Philadelphia Museum of Art when Rocky gives his son Rocky Marciano's cufflink, given to him years earlier as a gift from Mickey.

Cast 

 Sylvester Stallone as Robert "Rocky" Balboa, "The Italian Stallion": Heavyweight Champion of the World, who suffers from brain damage caused by the head-trauma he received at the hands of Ivan Drago in the previous film. Because of his injuries, Rocky is forced to officially retire from boxing. After moving back to Philadelphia, Rocky trains and manages underdog boxer Tommy Gunn and helps him to rise to fame. 
 Talia Shire as Adrian Balboa: Rocky's wife and support throughout his life and his boxing career.
 Burt Young as Paulie Pennino: Rocky's friend, and brother-in-law.
 Sage Stallone as Robert "Rocky" Balboa Jr.: Rocky and Adrian's only son, who gets involved with the wrong crowds during his father's absence, throughout the training and mentoring of Tommy Gunn.
 Tommy Morrison as Tommy "The Machine" Gunn: Underdog boxer, who rises to fame under Rocky's training. Throughout his career he is called Rocky's "shadow", and angrily seeks out another manager. After his achievements as Heavyweight Champion, and the public's continued dis-appreciation for him, he fights Rocky in an unofficial street fight, and loses.
 Burgess Meredith as Mickey Goldmill: Rocky's deceased friend, manager and trainer, a former bantamweight fighter from the 1920s and the owner of the local boxing gym. Burgess appears in new footage, filmed as a flashback to before Rocky's second fight with Apollo.
 Richard Gant as George Washington Duke: Loud and obnoxious boxing promoter, who repeatedly tries to convince Rocky to re-enter the ring. He becomes Tommy Gunn's manager during his shot at the Heavyweight Champion title.  
 Tony Burton as Tony "Duke" Evers: Rocky's friend, and former trainer and manager of Apollo Creed.
 Paul J. Micale as Father Carmine (uncredited)
 Michael Williams as Union Cane: Reigning Heavyweight Champion of the World who wants to fight legendary Rocky, and eventually fights Tommy Gunn. Williams was also a real-life boxer. He and Morrison were to have an actual match about a month after Rocky V was released, but it was canceled when Williams was hurt. The match was being hyped as "The Real Cane vs. Gunn Match."

The film has cameos by sportswriters and boxing analysts, including Al Bernstein, Stan Hochman and Al Meltzer, and sportscaster Stu Nahan, who was the ringside announcer in every Rocky movie except the sixth. Dolph Lundgren and Carl Weathers appear as Ivan Drago and Apollo Creed in archival footage, uncredited. Mr. T appears as his Rocky III character Clubber Lang in archival footage, uncredited. Hulk Hogan, from his Rocky III role as Thunderlips, appears in a still shot during the film's end credits sequence taken from the staredown the two engaged in during said film, also uncredited.

Jodi Letizia, who played street kid Marie in the original Rocky (1976), was supposed to reprise her role. Her character was shown to have ended up as Rocky predicted she would: a prostitute, but the scene ended up on the cutting room floor. She can briefly be seen during the street fight at the end. The character reappears in Rocky Balboa (2006) as a bartender and confidante to the aging Rocky. Actress Geraldine Hughes took over the role.

Kevin Connolly, who gained success as Eric Murphy on HBO's Entourage, was in his first acting role as neighborhood bully Chickie.

Production

Filming
Filming began in mid-January 1990. Some of the fight sequences were filmed at The Blue Horizon in Philadelphia, a venue which was a mecca for boxing in the city during the 1970s.

The Rocky statue, which was commissioned for Rocky III, had since been gifted to the city of Philadelphia and moved to the entrance of the Spectrum, and so had to be moved back to the Philadelphia Museum of Art for the filming.

Scenes with Mickey, played by Burgess Meredith, were trimmed in the final film when Rocky fights Tommy. Mickey appeared in ghost form on top of the railway bridge, giving words of encouragement. In the final film, this was made into flashbacks. The speech Mickey gives to Rocky in the flashback sequence is based on an interview with Cus D'Amato given in 1985, shortly after Mike Tyson's first professional bout.

As a promotional gimmick, replicas of the golden glove necklace featured so prominently in the film were distributed to moviegoers at the Hollywood premiere of Rocky V at Grauman's Chinese Theatre.

Professional wrestling veteran Terry Funk helped choreograph much of the street fight between Rocky and Tommy Gunn.

In the original script, Rocky is killed during the final fight with Tommy, dying in Adrian's arms in the street. According to Stallone, the director and the studio had second thoughts. Eventually, Stallone rewrote the ending, saying that he decided to change it because Rocky was supposed to be about perseverance and redemption, and having him die in a street brawl would be against the roots of the series.

Continuity
In the years following the film's release, Stallone acknowledged that the injury which forces Rocky to retire, referenced in the film as a potentially lethal form of 'brain damage', was inaccurate. Stallone stated that having discussed the story with many boxing medical professionals, the injury Rocky suffered was a milder form of brain damage, similar to that of a long term concussion that many boxers suffer from and by modern-day standards are still able to gain licenses to box. It would not have prevented Rocky from gaining a license to box nor killed him.

Tony Burton briefly reprises his role as Duke at the beginning of the film. However, during his scenes, Rocky refers to him as "Tony". In the credits, Burton is credited as playing "Tony", as opposed to "Duke" (possibly to avoid confusion with the George Washington Duke character). Rocky V is the third time in the series to do so, with the first being Rocky II as Apollo asked "What are you afraid of, Tony?", and the second time during Rocky IV after receiving a pep talk in the former Soviet Union, "Thanks, Tony." Rocky Balboa names Burton's character "Duke Evers".

Sage Stallone, Sylvester's real-life son, portrays his character's son in the film. In Rocky IV, he was portrayed as a nine-year-old child whereas Sage was 14 at the time of filming, making him a teenager in Rocky V, despite it taking place just days after the events of Rocky IV.

Music

Soundtrack

The soundtrack album is not the original motion picture score, but rather has music from and inspired by the film. This soundtrack features Joey B. Ellis, MC Hammer, 7A3, MC Tab, Rob Base, and Bill Conti. Most of the soundtrack album contains rap music, rather than the Bill Conti score. Also, two of the scores from Rocky IV were featured in this film's trailer, but were not present in the actual film or soundtrack. "The Measure of a Man" was written by Alan Menken, Elton John, Tim Rice and performed by John.

Like Rocky IV, a full version of "Gonna Fly Now" with lyrics is not heard in the film. However an instrumental horn version is played during the early scene where Rocky gets off the airplane, and at the end of the movie after Rocky defeats Tommy, another instrumental version is heard.  In addition, a solo piano version is heard during several scenes including where Balboa speaks with his son upon his return from Russia, and during the scenes where his property is being auctioned.

Reception

Box office
Anticipated to be one of the big hits of the 1990 holiday season, Rocky V finished third in its opening weekend, trailing Dances with Wolves and Home Alone, and never recovered. The film earned US$14 million on its opening weekend and $41 million in total in the US and Canada, about one-third of its predecessor's take. Rocky V however made almost twice as much overseas with a gross of $79 million, for a total of $120 million worldwide.

Critical response
Rocky V has a 31% approval rating on Rotten Tomatoes from 39 reviews, with the site consensus, "Rocky Vs attempts to recapture the original's working-class grit are as transparently phony as each of the thuddingly obvious plot developments in a misguided installment that sent the franchise flailing into longterm limbo." It also has a score of 55 out of 100 on Metacritic, based on 16 critics, indicating "mixed or average reviews". Audiences polled by CinemaScore gave the film an average grade of "A" on an A+ to F scale.

In 1999, Time placed the film on a list of the 100 worst ideas of the 20th century.

The Los Angeles Times regarded it as the best of the Rocky sequels.

Sylvester Stallone has publicly expressed hatred towards Rocky V, giving it a 0 out of 10.

Accolades
It was nominated for seven Golden Raspberry Awards in 1990 including Worst Picture, Worst Actor and Worst Screenplay for Stallone, Worst Actress for Shire, Worst Supporting Actor for Young, Worst Director for Avildsen and Worst Original Song for "The Measure of a Man".

Other media

Sequel 

Sixteen years later, Stallone wrote, directed and starred in the film Rocky Balboa. Stallone suggested that advances in medical science during the period between the films had shown that the injuries mentioned in Rocky V were less debilitating than once thought, and that he would receive a "clean bill of health" by the time of Rocky Balboa, allowing him to box again. The film grossed over $70 million at the US box office, and $85 million abroad, and received largely positive reviews.

Video games 
In 2002, a video game called Rocky, based on the first five Rocky films, was released by Rage Software.

A sequel was released by in 2004 by Venom Games called Rocky Legends, which further expanded on the story of the first four films.

References

External links

 
 
 
 
 
 

1990 films
1990s sports drama films
American sequel films
American sports drama films
American boxing films
Films scored by Bill Conti
Films about bullying
Films directed by John G. Avildsen
Films produced by Robert Chartoff
Films produced by Irwin Winkler
Films set in 1985
Films set in Moscow
Films set in Philadelphia
Films shot in Los Angeles
Films shot in Pennsylvania
Rocky (film series) films
Films with screenplays by Sylvester Stallone
Metro-Goldwyn-Mayer films
United Artists films
1990 drama films
Films about father–son relationships
1990s English-language films
1990s American films